Stéphane Arcangeloni (born 6 June 1972) is a French ice hockey player. He competed in the men's tournament at the 1994 Winter Olympics.

References

1972 births
Living people
Boxers de Bordeaux players
Brest Albatros Hockey players
Brûleurs de Loups players
Chamonix HC players
Olympic ice hockey players of France
Ours de Villard-de-Lans players
HC Pustertal Wölfe players
Ice hockey players at the 1994 Winter Olympics
Sportspeople from Grenoble